Cerro del Vigía is a hill in the municipality of Ponce, Puerto Rico, located just north of the city of Ponce. A tourist destination, it is home to Museo Castillo Serrallés, Cruceta del Vigía, and the former Hotel Ponce Intercontinental.

The 456-foot high hill sits at the foothills of the Cordillera Central and is located in Barrio Portugués Urbano. The hill is home to several well-to-do mansions of which the best known is Castillo Serrallés, now a Museum.

Location and geology
The hill is part of the Cordillera Central and is located just north of Barrio Segundo in the urban zone of Ponce. It is located at coordinates 18° 01' 08", -66° 37' 13". Just west of Cerro del Vigía is Ponce Cement, as the hills in this area are mostly limestone.

Best view
The view from atop Cerro del Vigía is said to be "the best view in all of Ponce". On a clear day, it is possible to see clearly all the way to Caja de Muertos.  There is a 100-feet observation cross at the top of the hill from where the entire zone can be observed. The best road for access to the top of the hill is Calle Bertoly.

See also

 Juan Serrallés
 Destilería Serrallés
 Don Q

Notes

References

Mountains in Ponce, Puerto Rico